Ehekirchen is a municipality in the district of Neuburg-Schrobenhausen in Bavaria, Germany.

References

Neuburg-Schrobenhausen